Shabbir Ali (born 26 January 1956) is an Indian football manager and former player. He was awarded the Dhyan Chand Award, the highest award in Indian sports for lifetime achievement, given by Government of India in 2011. He is the first footballer to be named for the Dhyan Chand Award.

Club career
As a footballer, Shabbir Ali was rated as the best player in India during the 1970s and 1980s. Arguably the finest striker of his time, Shabbir was a prolific goal scorer both at the national and international level. He rose to fame at a very early age when he captained India to win the Asian Youth championships in Bangkok jointly with Iran in 1974, a performance which even earned praise from the then Prime Minister, Indira Gandhi.

After playing with Tata Sports Club in Bombay for a few years, Shabbir Ali was lured away by the top Calcutta club, East Bengal in the late seventies. Later he joined Mohammedan Sporting and took the club to a great height before retiring from the same club in the mid-1980s.

During his captaincy, in 1983–84, the club won 9 trophies including back to back wins in Indian Federation Cup. Later in his playing days, he went to Bangladesh to play for Dhaka Football League side Dhaka Victoria Sporting, where he stayed for a season only.
 
Shabbir Ali scored 23 goals in international matches and remains one of India's all-time top scorers, ahead of Chuni Goswami, PK Banerjee, Inder Singh and Baichung Bhutia among others. In the 1976 Merdeka international football tournament in Kuala Lumpur, Shabbir Ali scored a hat-trick against Indonesia in the first 35 minutes. Only five footballers in India have scored an international hat-trick; of those, Shabbir Ali's is the fastest.

On his 65th birthday, Ali said, "Whatever I have become today because of football. Before retiring I was thinking I got everything from football. Now I have to give something back to the game. So, that is why I became a coach. Before retiring in 1987, I was player-cum-coach of Mohammedan Sporting. In 1988–89, I have pursued a diploma from NIS."

International career
For 13 years between 1972 and 1984, Ali was an automatic choice with the national team of India, be it Asian Youth, Asian Games, pre-Olympics, Asian Cup, Merdeka Cup tournament, Nehru Gold Cup, King's Cup or any other goodwill tour. He also captained India in Asian Youth, pre-Olympics, Nehru Cup, Merdeka and King's Cup tournaments. He gained fame when Arun Ghosh managed India U-20 team under his captaincy, went on to share the 1974 AFC Youth Championship title with Iran-20, in which he scored five goals.

One of his best moments came in the 1976 Merdeka international football tournament in Kuala Lumpur, where he scored a hat-trick against Indonesia within the first 35 minutes. Among Indians who have scored a hat-trick, Shabbir Ali's was the fastest.

He also appeared in 1976 Jasson Cup held in Afghanistan, with Indian team managed by Jarnail Singh. He played 72 international matches for India and scored 23 goals from 1972 to 1984 and scored 23 goals, and was one of the highest ranked goal scorers on the basis of strike rate per match.

Managerial career
After retiring as a footballer in 1985, Ali became a coach. He earned a first class diploma from the Sports Authority of India. He successfully passed the German football association B License coach and also their four-week coaching course, which is equivalent to A License.

As a coach, Ali proved to be a great success within a short period of time. Appointed the Technical Director of the India, Shabbir Ali steered the team to the gold medal in the 1995 South Asian Games in Chennai. It was a superb achievement considering the fact that India failed to win in the three previous South Asian Games  at Colombo, Islamabad and Dhaka. He remained the Technical Director till the pre-World Cup tournament in Qatar next year.

In the 1991–92 seasons, he made Mohammedan Sporting the Champion Club of India having won four tournaments and finished runners-up in two others. Next season, he took up the challenge of coaching a relatively smaller club when he accepted the assignment with Peerless SC. It took him only one season to promote the club to the Calcutta Super Division.

Between 1997 and 1999, Shabbir Ali managed top Goan outfit Salgaocar and established himself as India's best coach. Barring a few like PK Banerjee and Syed Nayeemuddin, no other coach in India could win so many titles in such a short span as Shabbir Ali did.

It started in 1998 when Salgaocar won the Goa Professional League under his guidance and went on to win the Indian Super Cup defeating the National League champions, Mohun Bagan AC. Next Salgaocar won the National League title, the only time a Goan team could win it till date. Shabbir Ali then took the team to Bombay and won the Rovers Cup. Thereafter, the team flew into Delhi to bag the Durand Cup beating both Mohun Bagan and East Bengal and then tamed Mohun Bagan again in the Super Cup contest. No other teams in India have been given such a great run in Indian football in recent years.

He also managed Churchill Brothers SC in 2004. In 2008, he was again appointment head coach of Mohammedan. In 2011–12 season, he managed Calcutta Football League side Southern Samity.

On 2 September 2022, he was unanimously appointed as the Chairman of the All India Football Federation Advisory Committee. He is also included in the board of eminent players of the AIFF.

Football academy
In February 2021, Ali launched a football academy in Hyderabad named Shabbir Ali Football Academy, that became operational from 1 March. The academy is also affiliated with Telangana Football Association.

Personal life
Beside football, Ali was appointed and worked as Scale-I officer of Allahabad Bank. In September 2013, he suffered a massive heart-attack and recovered.

Honours

Player
India
Pesta Sukan Cup: 1971
ANFA Cup runner-up: 1983
Afghanistan Republic Day Cup third place: 1976
King's Cup third place: 1977

India U20
 AFC Asian U-19 Championship: 1974

Mohammedan Sporting
Calcutta Football League: 1981
Federation Cup: 1983–84
Rovers Cup: 1980, 1984
Sait Nagjee Trophy: 1984
DCM Trophy: 1980
Sikkim Gold Cup: 1980
Durand Cup runner-up: 1980
IFA Shield runner-up: 1982

Individual
AFC Youth Championship top scorer: 1974
Calcutta Football League top scorer: 1983

Manager

Mohammedan Sporting
Federation Cup: 1984–85; runners-up: 1989–90
Stafford Cup: 1991
Rovers Cup: 1987; runner-up: 1991
Sait Nagjee Trophy: 1991, 1992
Bordoloi Trophy: 1985, 1986, 1991
All Airlines Gold Cup: 1986; unner-up: 1987, 1988, 1989, 1990
Independence Day Cup: 1988
Sikkim Governor's Gold Cup runner-up: 1986, 1987, 1989, 1991
Kalinga Cup: 1991
Vizag Trophy: 1986

Salgaocar
National Football League: 1998–99

Awards
Dhyan Chand Award in 2011, towards his service to coach Goan outfit Salgaocar Club between 1997 and 1999.
Banga Bhushan in 2014 by the Government of West Bengal

See also 
 List of India national football team hat-tricks
 List of Indian football players in foreign leagues
 List of India national football team captains

References

Bibliography

External links

1956 births
Living people
Indian footballers
Footballers from Hyderabad, India
India international footballers
India youth international footballers
1984 AFC Asian Cup players
Indian football managers
Recipients of the Dhyan Chand Award
Footballers at the 1982 Asian Games
Association football forwards
Asian Games competitors for India
East Bengal Club players
Mohammedan SC (Kolkata) players
Mohammedan SC (Kolkata) managers
Salgaocar FC managers
Mahindra United FC managers
Churchill Brothers FC Goa managers
Calcutta Football League players
Indian expatriate footballers
Expatriate footballers in Bangladesh